Jo Frost: Family Matters is a British tabloid talk show presented by Jo Frost. It was broadcast on ITV from 28 April to 5 September 2014.

Format
Similarly to The Jeremy Kyle Show, Family Matters was studio based with each family invited into the studio to talk to Frost about their family issues.

References

External links

2014 British television series debuts
2014 British television series endings
British television talk shows
ITV (TV network) original programming
Television series by ITV Studios
English-language television shows